Tremoleto is a village in Tuscany, central Italy,  administratively a frazione of the comune of Crespina Lorenzana, province of Pisa. At the time of the 2001 census its population was 105.

Tremoleto is about 30 km from Pisa and 6 km from Crespina.

References 

Frazioni of the Province of Pisa